Big Red Tequila (Bantam, 1997) is the first novel in Rick Riordan's series Tres Navarre and his first published book. It is a fast-paced crime story about an unusually talented and flawed hero, Jackson "Tres" Navarre, a third generation Texan, who has a PhD from Berkeley in Medieval Studies and English, works as an unlicensed private investigator, and is also a tai chi master.

After ten years in the San Francisco Bay area, Tres Navarre returns home to San Antonio, Texas to investigate the unsolved murder of his father, Bexar County Sheriff Jackson Navarre, and to rekindle a romance with his high school sweetheart, local art gallery owner Lillian Cambridge. The more Tres looks into the unsolved crime, the more trouble comes his way, and the more plunged into danger he gets.

This novel won the Anthony Award for best original paperback and the Shamus Award for best First Private Investigator novel in 1997.

References

1997 American novels
Novels set in Texas
Anthony Award-winning works
Shamus Award-winning works
Culture of San Antonio
Novels by Rick Riordan
San Antonio, Texas in fiction
1997 debut novels